CloneCD is proprietary optical disc authoring software that makes exact, 1:1 copies of music and data CDs and DVDs, regardless of any Digital Rights Management (DRM) restrictions. It was originally written by Oliver Kastl and offered by Swiss company Elaborate Bytes, but due to changes in European copyright law, they were forced to take it off the market. The last version of CloneCD made by Elaborate Bytes was version 4.2.0.2. The software was subsequently sold by SlySoft, a company located in Antigua and Barbuda, whose legislation does not ban the circumvention of DRM schemes. Since 2016, it is sold by Belize/Latvia based RedFox.

Region restrictions in older versions
In older versions of "CloneCD," the features "Amplify Weak Sectors," "Protected PC Games," and "Hide CDR Media" were disabled in the United States of America and Japan. Changing the region and language settings in Windows (e. g. to Canadian English) and/or patches could unlock these features in the two countries. SlySoft decided to leave these options disabled for the US for legal reasons, but, strangely enough, no features were disabled. The current version of CloneCD is not region-restricted.

See also
 CloneCD Control File
 List of disk imaging software
 Comparison of ISO image software

References

External links
 RedFox

Windows-only software
Optical disc authoring software